The Charles Daniels House is a historic house at 43 Liberty Street in Chester, Connecticut.  Built about 1830 for a local factory owner and moved to its present site in 1978, it is a prominent example of high-style Greek Revival architecture with a temple front, possibly designed by the firm of Ithiel Town.  The house was listed on the National Register of Historic Places in 1988.

Description and history
It is a -story Greek Revival structure, five bays wide, with a hip-roofed portico supported by paired Doric columns. Having been relocated, it rests on a replacement foundation of concrete blocks, whose exterior has been finished with the ashlar granite veneer of the original foundation.

The interior is organized around a central stair hall, with a double parlor to the west and a dining room and library to the east. These principal rooms are embellished with fine woodwork, fluted pilasters, and decorative plaster mouldings.

The house, built (probably in the late 1820s) for Charles Daniels, owner of a nearby gimlet factory, is an excellent example of Greek Revival domestic architecture.  Its design has traditionally been ascribed, without evidence, to the New Haven architecture firm of Town and Davis, one of whose principals was Ithiel Town. Nevertheless, the house is architecturally consistent with other works by Town.

The architect Thomas A. Norton moved it to its present site in 1978, and in reconstructing it, retained not only the original stone of the foundation veneer, but also the original brick of the chimney stacks.

Gallery

See also
National Register of Historic Places listings in Middlesex County, Connecticut

References

Houses on the National Register of Historic Places in Connecticut
Chester, Connecticut
Greek Revival houses in Connecticut
Houses in Middlesex County, Connecticut
Houses completed in 1830
National Register of Historic Places in Middlesex County, Connecticut
1830 establishments in Connecticut